Am I Guilty? Is an American film released in 1940 directed by Samuel Neufeld  for the Supreme Pictures Corporation. A. W. Hackel was the film's producer.; his Supreme Pictures, which had produced dozens of Western films, planned a series of films featuring African American casts but this was the only one to make it to release.

Toddy Pictures re-released the film as Racket Doctor in 1945. A Toddy Pictures poster for the film was appraised on an episode of the PBS show Antiques Roadshow.

The Pittsburgh Courier described a gala opening at the Apollo Theater in Harlem.

In the film's storyline, extraordinary measures are resorted to in order to help the poor as a young doctor sets up a free clinic in Harlem.

Advertisements for the film, including a lobby card, remain in existence.

Cast
Ralph Cooper as Dr. James Dunbar
Sybil Lewis as Joan Freeman
Sam McDaniel as John D. Jones
Lawrence Criner as "Trigger" Bennett
Marcella Moreland as Marcella
Monte Hawley
Pigmeat Markham
Reginald Fenderson
Clarence Brooks

References

External links 

1940 films
Toddy Pictures Company films
American black-and-white films
1940s English-language films
Race films
American drama films
1940s crime films
Films set in New York City
Films set in hospitals
1940s American films